Bliss N. Davis (December 8, 1801 – February 11 1885) was a Vermont politician and lawyer who served as President of the Vermont State Senate.

Biography
Bliss Nash Davis was born in Vergennes, Vermont on December 8, 1801.  He studied law, was admitted to the bar, and practiced, first in Hardwick, and later in Danville.

Davis served in local offices, including Justice of the Peace.  He was also involved in several businesses, including serving as President of the Caledonia National Bank.

Originally a Whig, and later a Republican, Davis served as Caledonia County State's Attorney from 1843 to 1844 and 1848 to 1850.

In 1850 Davis prosecuted William Warburton, alias "Bristol Bill" for counterfeiting.  Upon hearing the guilty verdict Bristol Bill stabbed Davis in the back of the neck.  Davis recovered, and the next day Bristol Bill was sentenced to 10 years in prison.

He served in the Vermont Senate from 1858 to 1860 and was Senate President in 1859.

Davis maintained an active law practice until just a few weeks before his death.  He died in Danville on February 11, 1885.

References

1801 births
1885 deaths
People from Vergennes, Vermont
People from Caledonia County, Vermont
Vermont lawyers
State's attorneys in Vermont
Vermont Whigs
19th-century American politicians
Vermont Republicans
Members of the Vermont House of Representatives
Vermont state senators
Presidents pro tempore of the Vermont Senate
19th-century American lawyers